Billbergia leptopoda is a plant species in the genus Billbergia. This species is endemic to Brazil.

Cultivars
 Billbergia 'Cold Fusion'
 Billbergia 'Curlew'
 Billbergia 'Curly Top'
 Billbergia 'Elfin'
 Billbergia 'Genevieve'
 Billbergia 'Harmony'
 Billbergia 'JCS'
 Billbergia 'Nez Misso'
 Billbergia 'Olive Baldwin'
 Billbergia 'Pink Surprise'
 Billbergia 'Raspberry Parfait'
 Billbergia 'Reward'
 Billbergia 'Samson'
 Billbergia 'Storm'

References

BSI Cultivar Registry Retrieved 11 October 2009

leptopoda
Endemic flora of Brazil
Flora of the Atlantic Forest
Flora of Bahia
Flora of Espírito Santo
Flora of Minas Gerais